Ramón Lentini (born 24 October 1988 in Posadas) is an Argentine football striker who plays for Güemes.

Career

A southpaw, Lentini was a staple of the Estudiantes de La Plata youth system since 2003, achieving renown as a scorer: he has a hundred goals to his name in the youth and reserve teams. Lentini signed his first professional contract at the age of 19, and made his debut with the squad on 7 December 2008 in a game against Colón de Santa Fe. Three days later, in his second game, a 2-1 defeat to Godoy Cruz, he scored his first goal. His second goal for Estudiantes was a crucial header against Peruvian side Sporting Cristal that cemented Estudiantes' entry into the group stage of 2009 Copa Libertadores.

With the arrival of coach Alejandro Sabella, Lentini had fewer opportunities and was loaned to Quilmes together with fellow scorer prospect Mauricio Carrasco for the 2009-10 season. His first goal for Quilmes was on September 25, 2009 against San Martín de San Juan. Lentini was part of the Quilmes squad that obtained promotion to the Argentine Primera División. He returned to Estudiantes at the end of the season and was again loaned to a second division side, Instituto de Córdoba.

Honours
Estudiantes de La Plata
Copa Libertadores: 2009

References

External links
 ESPN statistics
 Argentine Primera statistics
 Ramón Lentini at Soccerway

1988 births
Living people
People from Posadas, Misiones
Argentine footballers
Argentine expatriate footballers
Association football forwards
Estudiantes de La Plata footballers
San Martín de Tucumán footballers
Nueva Chicago footballers
Quilmes Atlético Club footballers
Aldosivi footballers
Instituto footballers
Unión Española footballers
San Luis de Quillota footballers
Olimpo footballers
Chacarita Juniors footballers
Gimnasia y Esgrima de Mendoza footballers
Chilean Primera División players
Argentine Primera División players
Primera B de Chile players
Primera Nacional players
Expatriate footballers in Chile
Argentine expatriate sportspeople in Chile
Sportspeople from Misiones Province